Sinophasma is a genus of Asian stick insects in the tribe Necrosciini, erected by Günther in 1940.  Species have been recorded from  China, Vietnam and Taiwan (distribution may be incomplete).

Species
The Phasmida Species File lists:
 Sinophasma angulatum Liu, 1987
 Sinophasma atratum Chen & He, 2000
 Sinophasma biacuminatum Chen & He, 2006
 Sinophasma bii Ho, 2012
 Sinophasma brevipenne Günther, 1940
 Sinophasma curvatum Chen & He, 1994
 Sinophasma damingshanensis Ho, 2014
 Sinophasma daoyingi Ho, 2012
 Sinophasma furcatum Chen & He, 1993
 Sinophasma guangdongensis Ho, 2012
 Sinophasma hainanense Liu, 1987
 Sinophasma hoenei Günther, 1940
 Sinophasma jinxiuense Chen & He, 2008
 Sinophasma klapperichi Günther, 1940 - type species
 Sinophasma largum Chen & Chen, 1998
 Sinophasma latisectum Chen & Chen, 1997
 Sinophasma maculicruralis Chen, 1986
 Sinophasma mirabile Günther, 1940
 Sinophasma obvium (Chen & He, 1995)
 Sinophasma pseudomirabile Chen & Chen, 1996
 Sinophasma rugicollis Chen, 1991
 Sinophasma striatum Chen & He, 2006
 Sinophasma trispinosum Chen & Chen, 1997
 Sinophasma truncatum (Shiraki, 1935)
 Sinophasma unispinosum Chen & Chen, 1997
 Sinophasma vietnamense Chen & Chen, 1999

References

External links

Phasmatodea genera
Phasmatodea of Asia
Lonchodidae